Choudlu is a village in the southern state of Karnataka, India. It is located in the Somvarpet taluk of Kodagu district.

Demographics
 India census, Choudlu was found to have a total population of 5,351 people: 2,669 male and 2,682 female.

See also
 Kodagu
 Districts of Karnataka
 Mangalore

References

External links
 http://Kodagu.nic.in/

Villages in Kodagu district